The 2003 season was Daegu F.C.'s first season in the South Korean K-League.

Season summary

For its first season, Kim Hak-Cheol was the designated captain, and Daegu brought in two Czech players, Roman Gibala and Jan Kraus for the season.  Another import was Turkish player Rahim Zafer, a former Turkish international defender who was in the twilight of his career.  Indio transferred in midseason to Daegu from Brazilian club Esporte Clube Santo André. Some of the key Korean foundation players included Lee Sang-il, who had played domestic football in Belgium, and Park Jong-jin who has played all his domestic football with Daegu, bar a two-year spell with Gwangju Sangmu when undertaking his military service.  Many of the Korean foundation players came to the club via University Football clubs, which meant that Daegu was their first experience of professional football.  The K-League structure for 2003 required each team to play 44 matches, making for a long drawn out season.   Daegu ultimately finished their first season 11th (out of 12 teams) in the league, winning 7 games, and drawing 16. 

In the 2003 Korean FA Cup, Daegu FC, as participants in the K-League, automatically qualified to the playoff phase (round of 32).  However, their wins at this stage of the competition were against National League sides and university club teams.  In their quarterfinal match, against their first serious opponent, and fellow K-League club Ulsan Hyundai Horangi, they were knocked out in a 1-nil result.

Squad

Players In/Out

In

Out

Statistics

|}

K-League

Standings

Korean FA Cup

Matches
(N) = Neutral Ground

See also
Daegu F.C.

References

External links
Official websites
  Daegu FC Official website 

2003
Daegu